The Continental Op is a fictional character created by Dashiell Hammett. He is a private investigator employed as an operative of the Continental Detective Agency's San Francisco office. The stories are all told in the first person and his name is never given.

Profile 
The Continental Op is a master of deceit in the exercise of his occupation. In his 1927 Black Mask story "$106,000 Blood Money" the Op is confronted with two dilemmas: should he expose a corrupt fellow detective, thereby hurting the reputation of his agency; and should he also allow an informant to collect the $106,000 reward in a big case even though he is morally certain—but cannot prove—that the informant has murdered one of his agency's clients? The Op resolves his two problems neatly by manipulating events so that the corrupt detective and the informant get into an armed confrontation in which both are killed.

Decades of witnessing human cruelty, misery, and ruin, as well as being instrumental in sending hundreds of people to jail, or to the gallows, have greatly weakened the Op's natural sympathy with his fellow men. He fears becoming like his boss, "The Old Man", whom he describes as "a shell, without any human feelings whatsoever".

In the penultimate chapter of The Dain Curse, a female client, whose life the Op has saved three times, while also curing her of morphine addiction, says to him:

The Op is one of the first major hardboiled detectives later developed in such characters as Hammett's own Sam Spade, Raymond Chandler's Philip Marlowe, Mickey Spillane's Mike Hammer, Ross Macdonald's Lew Archer and others.

Publication history 
As many of Hammett's short stories were later published in collected volumes, the publishing history of these works is sometimes confused. The Continental Op made his debut in the October 1923 issue of Black Mask, making him one of the earliest hard-boiled private detective characters to appear in the pulp magazines of the early twentieth century. He appeared in 36 short stories, all but two of which appeared in Black Mask.

With the intent of transitioning from short stories to novels, Hammett began writing linked stories in 1924, "The House in Turk Street" and "The Girl with the Silver Eyes".  Two other related stories, "The Big Knockover" and "$106,000 Blood Money" appeared in Black Mask in 1927. The transition culminated in 1927, with the linked stories which formed the basis for his first two novels, Red Harvest  and The Dain Curse, both novels released in 1929. The texts in the novels differ from the pulp magazine versions as they were revised by an editor at Alfred A. Knopf.

Starting in the Second World War, many of the short stories were reprinted as serials in American newspapers, sometimes under different titles. Ten collections of Hammett short works, including most of the Continental Op stories, were published by Mercury Publications under an imprint, either "Bestsellers Mystery", "A Jonathan Press Mystery" or "Mercury Mystery". The majority of these collections printed as paperbacks contained introductory essays by Ellery Queen. Frederic Dannay, half of the duo using the pseudonym Ellery Queen, compiled and edited the Hammett's stories such that these versions are not complete.  Of the ten, the following contain Continental Op stories:
$106,000 Blood Money later republished as The Big Knock-Over, The Continental Op, The Return of the Continental Op, Hammett Homicides, Dead Yellow Women, Nightmare Town, Creeping Siamese, and Women in the Dark. When the paperback collections proved popular, World Publishing under their "Tower Books" imprint, published them in hardcover. Many of these edited versions were later republished as Dell mapbacks.

In the late 1960s, Hammett's writing was rediscovered and republished with somewhat confusing titles. Of the 28 stories not a part of Red Harvest or The Dain Curse, 26 have been made available in one of three collections, The Big Knockover, The Continental Op, and Nightmare Town. These new anthologies do not include the same stories as the similarly titled Mercury Publications. Up until the twenty first century these 3 volumes were the easiest way to access most of the stories. But all of these collections used the abridged versions Dannay created for his compilations.

The Library of America's Complete Novels includes both Red Harvest and The Dain Curse as printed by Knopf. The companion collection Crime Stories and Other Writings uses the original pulp magazine texts. For the first two printings of this collection, as is said in the Notes on the Texts : "No copy is known to be extant of the issue of the pulp magazine Mystery Stories in which ‘This King Business’ initially appeared, in January 1928.” When a copy was located a third printing was issued with the integral text.

In 2017, Vintage Crime published a complete collection of all 36 Continental Op stories also based on the pulp magazine texts and an, until then, unpublished story fragment entitled "Three Dimes."

List of stories 

Using the texts that were first published in the pulp magazines, The Big Book of the Continental Op includes all 37 entries of the list; the 28 short stories, the unfinished story and the eight parts of the two serialized novels, The Cleansing of Poisonville (Red Harvest) and The Dain Curse as they first appeared in the pulp magazines.

Dramatic adaptations
In 1939, The Farewell Murder was adapted as Another Thin Man, the third entry in the Thin Man film series. The story was modified to star Hammett's Nick and Nora Charles in place of the Continental Op.
In 1978, The Dain Curse was made into a six-hour CBS television miniseries starring James Coburn. For the miniseries, the Op was named Hamilton Nash (his creator's name 'spelled sideways').
In 1982, Peter Boyle played the Continental Op in the opening of Hammett, while Hammett (Frederic Forrest) writes a story about the detective character. Boyle later appears as Jimmy Ryan, Hammett's former co-worker and mentor from his Pinkerton days, who expresses a conviction that the Op is based on him and criticizes Hammett for not giving the character a name.
In 1995, Christopher Lloyd played The Continental Op in "Fly Paper", in season 2 episode 7 of the TV anthology series Fallen Angels adapted from Hammett's short story, co-starring Darren McGavin as The Old Man.

See also

 Detective fiction

References

External links
 Continental Op stories at LibriVox (public domain audiobooks)

Fictional characters from San Francisco
Characters in American novels of the 20th century
Fictional private investigators
Characters in pulp fiction
Series of books
Literary characters introduced in 1923
Fictional characters without a name
Dashiell Hammett characters
Male characters in literature